KAFW may refer to:

 the ICAO code for Fort Worth Alliance Airport
 KAFW-LP, a defunct low-power television station (channel 48) formerly licensed to Abilene, Texas, United States